The Statute Law Revision Act 1873 (36 & 37 Vict c 91) is an Act of the Parliament of the United Kingdom.

This Act was partly in force in Great Britain at the end of 2010.

The enactments which were repealed (whether for the whole or any part of the United Kingdom) by this Act were repealed so far as they extended to the Isle of Man on 25 July 1991.

This Act was retained for the Republic of Ireland by section 2(2)(a) of, and Part 4 of Schedule 1 to, the Statute Law Revision Act 2007.

The Preamble, and the Schedule, to this Act were repealed by section 1 of, and Part 1 of the Schedule to, the Statute Law Revision Act 1898 (61 & 62 Vict c 22).

Section 2 of the Statute Law Revision Act 1874 provided that the 55 Geo 3 c 91, which had been repealed by this Act, was revived, so far as it related to the county of the city of Dublin.

Section 3 of the Statute Law Revision Act 1875 provided that section 25 of the 9 Geo 4 c 58, which had been repealed by this Act, was revived, as from the repeal thereof, and that all proceedings taken thereunder since that repeal were as valid and effectual as if that section had not been repealed.

This Act was amended by section 2 of the Statute Law Revision Act 1878.

See also
Statute Law Revision Act

References
Halsbury's Statutes,
The Public General Statutes passed in the thirty-sixth and thirty-seventh years of the reign of Her Majesty Queen Victoria, 1873. Queen's Printer. East Harding Street, London. 1873. Pages 555 to 644.

External links
  ["Note" and "Schedule" of the bill (unlike the schedule of the act as passed) gives commentary on each scheduled act, noting any earlier repeals and the reason for the new repeal]
 List of amendments and repeals in the Republic of Ireland from the Irish Statute Book.

United Kingdom Acts of Parliament 1873